William Ames (died 1662) was an early English itinerant Quaker preacher and writer.

Life
He joined the Quakers in 1655 at Dublin, having been a Baptist minister in Somerset, and afterwards an officer in the parliamentary army. He settled at Amsterdam in 1657, where he was tolerated, though once confined for a short time as a lunatic. Ames zealously preached to the Collegiants and they were initially in accord although later they fell out. He travelled in Germany, and was favourably received by Charles I Louis, Elector Palatine. He returned to England in 1662, was sent to Bridewell for attending a Quaker meeting, and died before the end of the year.

Works
He wrote a large number of tracts in Dutch, the titles of which are given in Joseph Smith's Catalogue of Friends' Books.

See also
 The Light upon the Candlestick

References

Sources

External links
 

Year of birth missing
1662 deaths
Converts to Quakerism
English Quakers